Kirsty Ellen Duncan  (born October 31, 1966) is a Canadian politician and medical geographer from Ontario, Canada. Duncan is the Member of Parliament (MP) for the Toronto riding of Etobicoke North, and served as deputy leader of the government in the House of Commons. Duncan has previously served as minister of science and minister of sport and persons with disabilities. She has published a book about her 1998 expedition to uncover the cause of the 1918 Spanish flu epidemic.

Early life and education
After graduating from Kipling Collegiate Institute in 1985 as an Ontario scholar, Duncan studied geography and anthropology at the University of Toronto. She then entered graduate school at the University of Edinburgh in Scotland, and completed a Doctor of Philosophy (Ph.D.) degree in geography in 1992.

Duncan said that she was emotionally and psychologically abused during her time as a gymnast. According to Duncan, after starting gymnastics at age six, she was repeatedly called fat despite being a normal weight. She developed unhealthy eating habits to avoid gaining wait and by her second year of undergrad, had damaged her stomach lining.

Academic career
Duncan was an associate professor of Health Studies at the University of Toronto, where she taught global environmental processes and medical geography. Duncan is the former research director for the AIC Institute of Corporate Citizenship at the Rotman School of Management. As well, Duncan served on the Intergovernmental Panel on Climate Change, an organization which won the Nobel Prize in 2007.

From 1993 to 2000, Duncan taught meteorology, climatology and climate change at the University of Windsor. In 1992, as she became aware of the increasing probability of a global flu crisis, she was led to investigate the cause of the similar 1918 Spanish flu pandemic, saying, "I was horrified we didn’t know what caused Spanish flu, and also knew that if we could find fragments of the virus, we might be able to find a better flu vaccine".

Though at the time she "knew nothing about influenza", she began what she called a "six-month crash course in virology". Eventually, she began searching for possible frozen samples of lung and brain tissue that might contain the virus. Her initial thoughts led her to think of Alaska, as it contains large areas of permafrost, which would leave the viruses intact, but the search proved fruitless.

Eventually, after several years of searching, Duncan learned of seven miners who had died from the Spanish flu and were buried in the small town of Longyearbyen, Norway, an area that would contain permafrost. She then began assembling a team of scientists to accompany her. After several more years of preparation, which involved garnering various permissions to perform the exhumations, the ground survey began in 1998. The expedition was exemplary in terms of biosafety procedures and treatment of culturally sensitive sites.  However, it did not yield samples from which the virus could be reconstructed, as the bodies were not in permafrost.

In 2003, Duncan wrote a book about her expedition, entitled Hunting the 1918 Flu: One Scientist's Search for a Killer Virus. Published by the University of Toronto Press, it details Duncan's process and the expedition itself. After the book's publication, Duncan began speaking about pandemics, which led her to begin teaching corporate social responsibility at the University of Toronto's Rotman School of Management. In 2008, Duncan published a second book, Environment and Health: Protecting our Common Future.

Duncan was an adjunct professor teaching both medical geography at the University of Toronto and global environmental processes at Royal Roads University, and served on the Intergovernmental Panel on Climate Change, an organization that won the 2007 Nobel Peace Prize with Al Gore.

In 2018, the University of Edinburgh awarded her an honorary degree.

Federal politics
In February 2008, Roy Cullen announced that he would not be running in the next federal election and Duncan was appointed as the next Liberal candidate. She was elected in the 2008 general election and re-elected in the 2011, 2015, 2019 and 2021 general elections.

On November 4, 2015, Prime Minister Justin Trudeau appointed her to the Cabinet as minister of science. Duncan was tasked with establishing the new position of chief science officer that would serve as a replacement to the national science adviser role eliminated by Stephen Harper in 2008. As well Duncan became minister for sports and persons with disabilities after Kent Hehr resigned from Cabinet following sexual misconduct allegations. 

As minister of science and sport, Duncan has made ending abuse and harassment in sport her priority since taking over the portfolio in January 2018. In February 2019, Duncan convened provincial and territorial sports ministers to sign a joint declaration on combating misconduct such as abuse, harassment, and discrimination. The 2019 federal budget promised $30 million over the next five years to achieve those goals.

Duncan wanted to institute a series of initiatives, including establishing new policy for national sports organizations, funding the Sport Dispute Resolution Centre of Canada to create an investigation unit, and setting up a toll-free confidential tipline for athletes and witnesses to call if they experience abuse. Duncan's action items included creating a code of conduct with sanctions and finding a way to prevent coaches or officials from freely moving to another province or club after allegations of abuse. Currently this action item is a work in progress.

Duncan's priority as minister of science was to "unmuzzle our scientists". Duncan was able to bring back the long-form census in 2016 and the chief scientific advisor position.

Duncan reported that the government in 2018 devoted $2.8 billion to renewing Canada's federal science laboratories because they said that they understand the critical role that government researchers play in Canada's science and research community.

Duncan was re-elected in the 2019 federal election, following which she was appointed deputy leader of the government in the House of Commons. The sports portfolio folded into the Canadian Heritage portfolio. After the 2021 federal election, she became the chair of the science and research committee.

On January 26, 2023, Duncan issued a statement that should would be taking medical leave, but remain as an MP, because of a "physical health challenge". The following day, Duncan called for a public inquiry into abuse in Canadian sports and criticized the Trudeau government for not effectively following up on her initiatives as sports minister.

Electoral record

See also
Johan Hultin, a pathologist who also used frozen tissues to study the 1918 influenza virus

References

External links

1966 births
Alumni of the University of Edinburgh
Women members of the House of Commons of Canada
Liberal Party of Canada MPs
Living people
University of Toronto alumni
Members of the House of Commons of Canada from Ontario
Women in Ontario politics
People from Etobicoke
Politicians from Toronto
Academic staff of the University of Toronto
Members of the 29th Canadian Ministry
Members of the King's Privy Council for Canada
Women government ministers of Canada
21st-century Canadian women politicians
Canadian geographers